Potaninskaya Street 10a is a two-story building in Tsentralny District of Novosibirsk, Russia. It was constructed in 1915. The main facade of the house faces Potaninskaya Street. The building is an architectural monument of regional significance.

History
The house was built in 1915.

In 1922, the building was occupied by the editorial office of the Sibirskie Ogni literary and artistic journal.

22 September 2017, the building caught fire.

Organizations
As of September 2017, the building is occupied by three restaurants.

Gallery

References

Buildings and structures completed in 1915
Buildings and structures in Novosibirsk